DOSAAF, full name Volunteer Society for Cooperation with the Army, Aviation, and Navy, was a paramilitary sport organization in the Soviet Union, concerned mainly with weapons, automobiles and aviation. The society was established in 1927 as OSOAVIAKhIM and from 1951 to 1991 carried the name of DOSAAF.

The society was preserved in some post-Soviet Republics, e.g. Russia and Belarus, although these may use a different name.  In Ukraine, for example, the counterpart is "Society of Assistance to Defense of Ukraine".  In Russia it was reformed in December 1991 as the Russian Defense Sports-Technical Organization (ROSTO). In December 2009, ROSTO was renamed DOSAAF Russia. For Belarus, see DOSAAF (Belarus).

The stated goal of the society was "patriotic upbringing of the population and preparation of it to the defense of the Motherland". Among the means to achieve this was the development of paramilitary sports. Initially, an important goal was financial support of the Soviet Armed Forces. At the same time, ordinary sports were supported within the framework of DOSAAF facilities such as sports halls, stadiums, swimming pools, gymnasiums and others.

History

OSOAVIAKhIM 

The precursor of DOSAAF was the OSOAVIAKhIM (full name: , 'Union of Societies of Assistance to Defense and Aviation-Chemical Construction of the USSR') created on 27 January 1927 by merging  the Society of Assistance to Defense, Society of Friends of the Air Force and Society of Friends of Chemical Defense and the Chemical Industry.

The goal of the society was preparation of reserves for armed forces. It soon became a powerful paramilitary with its own airfields, radio clubs, parachuting towers, and firing ranges. It became prestigious and romantic among Soviet youth to earn badges such as "Voroshilov sharpshooter", "Voroshilov horse rider" and "Distinguished Parachute Jumper". Gradually, OSOAVIAKhIM developed into a back-up military training organization. Its courses included advanced disciplines like tactics, topography and armament. In contrast to the usual draft, a person could join OSOAVIAKhIM as early as 14.

OSOAVIAKhIM supported a number of professional research and development programs for airplanes, glider, airships and stratospheric balloons, some of which were later taken over by the Soviet Air Forces. In 1934, the organisation carried out the record-setting mission of the high-altitude balloon Osoaviakhim-1. Also in the 1930s, Sergey Korolev's rocket research organization, GIRD, and Oleg Antonov's glider project, among other efforts, were part of the OSOAVIAKhIM.

Post-World War II 

In March 1948, OSOAVIAKhIM was reorganized into three separate societies: The Voluntary Society of Assistance to the Army, The Voluntary Society of Assistance to the Air Force and The Voluntary Society of Assistance to the Navy. On 20 August 1951 they were re-merged as a single society, DOSAAF.

See also
Svazarm, in Czechoslovakia
Defense Assistance Organization, Bulgarian government-sponsored network of youth clubs 
SSSR-V6 OSOAVIAKhIM (Osoaviakhim airship)
US Civil Air Patrol

References

Further reading

External links

ROSTO ("Russian Defense Sports-Technical Organization")

Soviet state institutions
Military of the Soviet Union
Civic and political organizations based in the Soviet Union
Military education and training in the Soviet Union
1927 establishments in the Soviet Union
Organizations disestablished in 1991
Sport societies in the Soviet Union
Recipients of the Order of Lenin
Military units and formations awarded the Order of the Red Banner